Kiss Me Once is the twelfth studio album by Australian singer Kylie Minogue, released on 14 March 2014 by Parlophone. It is her first studio release since 2010's Aphrodite, and marks Minogue's first and only album with Roc Nation, handled by American rapper and businessman Jay-Z. They both enlisted several songwriters and producers such as Sia, Cutfather, Greg Kurstin, Pharrell Williams, and MNEK. Musically, it was recognised by music critics as Minogue's return to contemporary pop music, incorporating musical elements of dance-pop, disco, electropop, and R&B. Lyrically, the songs focus on themes such as romance, sex, self-empowerment, and having fun.

Upon its release, Kiss Me Once received generally favorable reviews from most music critics. The majority of them complimented Minogue's charm and vocal delivery, alongside her return to contemporary pop music. However, critics were polarised towards the content and production; some felt the material was fun, but majority dismissed its memorability and felt it lacked innovation on Minogue's behalf. Commercially, the album performed moderately worldwide, reaching the top 10 in regions such as Australia, the United Kingdom, Ireland, Spain and France. It is her fourth highest-charting album on the US Billboard 200, peaking at number 31. However, the overall lack of success for Kiss Me Once prompted Minogue to leave Parlophone, citing artistic differences.

"Into the Blue" and "I Was Gonna Cancel" were released as the album's main singles; the former experienced moderate success on several countries, while the latter failed to generate a similar success. The album tracks: "Million Miles", "Sexercize", "Sexy Love", and "Beautiful" were promoted as radio tracks in different worldwide regions. To further promote the album, Minogue commenced her Kiss Me Once Tour in September 2014, and finished in March 2015; by April 2015, the concert tour amassed $21 million ticket sales and released an accompanying live album and concert DVD in Glasgow, Scotland.

Background
In 2012, Minogue began a year-long celebration for her 25 years in the music industry, which was often known as "K25". The anniversary started on 3 March with her 20-minute medley performance at the Sydney Gay and Lesbian Mardi Gras in front of 15,000 people. Two weeks later, Minogue embarked the Anti Tour in Australia and the UK, featured B-sides, demos and rarities from her music catalogue. She released the single "Timebomb" in May, before releasing the greatest hits album The Best of Kylie Minogue in June. Minogue announced two releases in October: the compilation album The Abbey Road Sessions that features reworked and orchestral versions of her previous songs which were recorded at London's Abbey Road Studios; and the K25 Time Capsule box set that contained 25 mini-CDs.

Following the release of Minogue's orchestral compilation album The Abbey Road Sessions (2012), she parted ways with her long-term manager Terry Blamey and his team, and announced a musical hiatus. Then, in February 2013, she announced via Instagram and Twitter that she signed a management contract with American rapper and businessman Jay-Z's imprint Roc Nation. Following the announcement that same month, British publications reported about Minogue's 12th studio album and commented that she had been collaborating with Australian musician Sia, which Minogue confirmed. In May 2013, Minogue commented to American magazine Rolling Stone that the album was "bringing out something different... which is cool". She also recognised that she had to "do something different", but added that the album "will maintain the DNA of what a Kylie track is, because I'm on it. I like to try and move the goalpost and experiment with different sounds."

Production

Minogue began initial sessions for the album in January 2012 in London and Los Angeles. Throughout March–July, Minogue announced collaborations with Norwegian team Stargate, American producer Darkchild, American rapper Brooke Candy, MNDR, and will.i.am via Twitter. On 27 May, one day before Minogue's 45th birthday, she teased information about an "interesting" collaboration, later revealed as a duet with Spanish singer Enrique Iglesias. 
In February 2014, Minogue confirmed Sia as the album's executive co-producer. Minogue stated in an interview with American website Idolator that "I got on with her so well... I asked her if she would executive-produce. I was hoping she would say yes. I didn't know if it was something she had done or was interested in, or if maybe she just preferred writing and doing her own music." That same month, she commented to American Billboard magazine; "I felt like I needed a new landscape, and once you've got your feet on the ground you're raring to go. [...] So far the support has been great, and it's just another part of this amalgamation of 'new' that I had wished for and was struck by."

Minogue enlisted several songwriters and producers to create the album, including Sia, Cutfather, Greg Kurstin, Pharrell Williams, and MNEK amongst others. Minogue recorded majority of the album in Los Angeles and New York City, with additional recording and mixing handled in London. In an interview with The Huffington Post, Minogue revealed that she and Furler had recorded several tracks that did not appear on the final cut in comparison to her previous album Aphrodite (2010). Minogue recalled that the number of tracks that did not appear collated into "three albums" in "three genres": a "pure pop" album, a "dancy-urban" album, and an "indie" album. She also said both she and Furler selected tracks from each they felt represented Kiss Me Once at the time. Regarding the recording process, she revealed to Colleen Quill at Radio.com, "Compared to the early days for me, I'm really comfortable in the studio. I record really fast, my leads, my backing vocals and the harmonies. I'm kind of like a machine doing that."

Music and lyrics
Musically Kiss Me Once has been described by critics from publications such as Timeout.com, The Guardian, and Clash Magazine as Minogue's return to contemporary pop music. According to Quill, she stated that the album was a form of return to "pure pop" that also incorporated elements of dance music. Tim Sendra, writing for AllMusic, categorised the album as "an intoxicating blend of uptempo dance tracks, funky club cuts, sexy midtempo jams, and the occasional ballad." NME'''s Ben Cardew noted elements of contemporary R&B and dubstep in some of the tracks, including "Sexercize" and "If Only". Similarly, Kitty Empire from The Observer felt the album was "rooted" with R&B music and incorporated elements of funk, disco, and electronic dance music (EDM).

Song analysis
The album opens with "Into the Blue", which Minogue describes lyrically as an "escape" and "free". The track was described by Matt Bagwell from The Huffington Post as a "euphoric" and "melancholy" track, and was labelled "age-appropriate dance-pop". "Million Miles" was compared to the work of Dragonette, where it was commented by PopMatters critic Ryan Lathan that it featured real instrumentation including electric guitars and keyboards; he later concluded it as an electropop song. According to Minogue, the idea of the third track, "I Was Gonna Cancel", came about when she attended a recording session with American producer Pharrell Williams and "burst into tears"; then onwards, Williams composed the track inspired by Minogue's moment. She was booked with Williams for only one day throughout the entire process of the album, leading to only two tracks finished by him. Bagwell compared the "electro funk" sound to her 2003 album Body Language. "Sexy Love" was one of the first of three tracks on the album that represented "sex", a recurring theme on the album; according to Lathan, it is a "disco-pop" anthem. Paul Keevers from SameSame felt it was the "offspring" to Minogue's 2008 single "Wow". "Sexercize", the second of "sex" songs, was criticized by several critics for its "dated" dubstep/brostep production and lyrical content. The sixth track, "Feels So Good", is a cover song that was adapted from the demo track "Indiana" written and recorded by Tom Aspaul; Bagwell labelled it a "mid-tempo electro" recording.

According to Lathan, the first R&B entry, "If Only", "begins with a brief synth chordal progression before giving way to the steady sound of stadium-size handclaps, which form the basis of the song's marching rhythm." The final track that represents the "sex" theme is "Les Sex", which Minogue described her favourite out of the trio set. Joe Muggs from Fact Magazine felt the lyrical content was slightly campy and described it as an "electro" song. The title track, "Kiss Me Once", was appreciated by music critics as a return to Minogue's "romantic" lyrical content instead of sex. Described as a mid-tempo pop song that resembled her 1980s releases, Levine from Attitude compared the quality and production style to the title track from her previous studio album. The album's only pop ballad and duet, "Beautiful", was heavily criticized for its overuse of Auto-tune and vocoder techniques, but commended for its lyrical hook during the chorus. Minogue revealed that she did not meet Iglesias to record the track, as she was in Paris at the time. The album's standard edition closer was "Fine", the only co-written track by Minogue. An empowerment anthem that utilizes musical elements of electro and house music, it was heavily commended by critics as an "accomplishment" to Minogue's back catalogue. The album's bonus tracks: "Mr. President" and "Sleeping With the Enemy" were noted by critics as electro entries; the former was described by Bradley Stern from MuuMuse as "silly fun", and using samples of Marilyn Monroe's "Happy Birthday, Mr. President" speech, and the latter was noted as "dreamy" and "lush."

Packaging and release
English fashion stylist William Baker shot the artwork for Kiss Me Once. After a week of teasing on social media, Minogue revealed the album title and cover artwork on 24 January 2014. The artwork shows Minogue closing her eyes and pursing her red lips for a kiss. The close-up shot of Minogue was taken behind a sheet of wet glass. The piece gave Carolyn Menyes of Music Times a sense of drama and desire, while Robbie Daw of Idolator described it as "warm, colorful and perfectly pop". From the same publication, Mike Wass opined that the flirtatious cover leaves a strong visual impression and indicates Minogue has "really brought her inner-sex kitten" for the album. Seamus Duff of Metro viewed the artwork as a "silent plea to America to open the window and let her in".

A week before its release in the UK, Kiss Me Once was made available for streaming in full on the official website of The Guardian on 10 March. The album was first released in Australia and Germany by Warner Music on 14 March. Three days later, the album was made available in European countries and the UK in two versions: a 11-track standard version, and a deluxe version featured two bonus tracks "Mr. President" and "Sleeping With the Enemy". Kiss Me Once was released in North America on 18 March, and distributed a day later in Japan; the latter region featured two bonus tracks: "Sparks" and a remix of "Into the Blue" by Japanese musician Yasutaka Nakata. In Europe, a special double-12-inch vinyl was issued on 17 May and featured a bonus digital download code for the bonus tracks. Minogue's website distributed a limited edition box set that restricted physical units to 3,500 worldwide. On 8 December 2014, Parlophone and Warner Music Group re-released the album on the iTunes Store; it included several live performances at the iTunes Festival. On the censored version of the album in South Africa, "Sexy Love" is titled "Love", "Sexercize" is titled "Exercize" and "Les Sex" is retitled "We Could Call It".

Promotion

On 13 February 2014, Minogue gave a surprise live performance of "Into the Blue" and "Les Sex" at the Old Blue Last Pub in Shoreditch. Four days later, she released an album-sampler video of 11 standard tracks on YouTube, featuring 50-second snippets of each song. In March, she performed "Into the Blue" in several television programs in the UK, including the semi-final episode of The Voice UK and the fundraising event Sport Relief 2014. Two intimate concert shows were held in London (18 March) and Melbourne (25 April), where Minogue performed several tracks from Kiss Me Once. She went on to perform "I Was Gonna Cancel" at the 2014 Logie Awards, her first appearance at the award show in 25 years. Minogue was accused of lip-syncing to the performance, which she later denied a day later.

In August, Minogue performed a seven-song set at the 2014 Commonwealth Games closing ceremony, among them were "Into the Blue" and "Beautiful". The ceremony was watched by an average of 6.8 million viewers. Streaming platform Amazon Music reported a 669% sales increase for Kiss Me Once within 24 hours after the show. She embarked the Kiss Me Once Tour in Liverpool in September 2014. The concert tour traveled through the United Kingdom, Europe and Australia. The staging of the tour was inspired by detailed geometry and Bauhaus aesthetics. The concert tour achieved $17 million throughout ticket sales in Europe,European boxscore data and an additional $4 million throughout Australia. An accompanying live album and concert DVD was released on 23 March 2015, which was shot in Glasgow, Scotland in November 2014. Minogue's performance on 27 September, as a part of 2014 iTunes Festival, was streamed live and made available on the iTunes Store for a limited time.

Singles and additional releases
Two official singles were spawned from Kiss Me Once. "Into the Blue" was released as the lead single on 27 January 2014. Its digital and vinyl releases in March included the dance-pop B-side track "Sparks".; 
The single's artwork shows Minogue wearing a see-through crochet dress. The music video for "Into the Blue" was directed by Dawn Shadforth, featuring French actor Clément Sibony as Minogue's love interest. The single peaked at number 46 in her native Australia, and number twelve in the UK. In the United States, "Into the Blue" peaked at the top of the Billboard Dance Club Songs chart. The second single, "I Was Gonna Cancel", was issued on 22 April as a digital remix bundle and a seven-inch vinyl. Directed by Dimitri Basil, an accompanying music video was filmed at Docklands Studios Melbourne, Minogue's first video to be filmed in Melbourne since "Better the Devil You Know" (1990). The video, which shows Minogue stands among a bustling crowd, sparked controversy as several dancers stated they were unpaid for the 11-hour shoot; Minogue and Basil later denied these claims. The single peaked at number 5 on the Billboard Dance Club Songs chart and number 59 on the UK Singles Chart.

A year prior to the album release, on 28 May 2013, Minogue posted the dubstep track "Skirt" on SoundCloud. "Skirt" served as a buzz single for Kiss Me Once; it did not appear on the album, but was re-released as a digital EP on the iTunes Store in June. That month, an accompanying lyric video was published on Nowness, featuring more than 1,000 still photos shot of Minogue posing in a hotel room. "Crystallize", another track did not make into the final tracklist, was released as a charity single for the fundraising campaign One Note For Cancer on 26 May 2014. Originally intended to be included on the Japanese edition of Kiss Me Once, "Golden Boy" was released exclusively on 7" vinyl on 19 April 2014 for Record Store Day. An official music video for "Sexercize" was released on 19 March, in which Minogue doing gymnasium exercises in erotic positions. Minogue further promoted "Sexercize" by launching the sexercize.tv website, where she showcased several visual interpretations of "Sexercize". "Sexy Love" served as a promotional single in Australia in June, before "Million Miles" was sent to Spanish radio in July. "Beautiful" was sent to the radio in the UK on 15 February 2014, before its digital release in Australia on 14 March.

Critical receptionKiss Me Once received generally positive reviews from music critics. At Metacritic, which assigns a weighted mean rating out of 100 to reviews by music critics, the album received an average score of 66, based on 19 reviews, which indicates "generally favorable reviews". Writing for AllMusic, Tim Sendra commended Kiss Me Once as a "glittering, fun, and surprisingly powerful album that's classic Kylie through and through." Sal Cinquemani from Slant Magazine believed that Kiss Me Once is better than a typical Minogue album, even though the material did not have enough commercial appeal like her previous efforts. Ben Cardew of NME said the album proved that "after 26 years in the business, Kylie can still pull off a very modern pop album." Ryan Lathan from PopMatters examined that Kiss Me Once was one of Minogue's album's that did not showcase any re-inventions or was not a "game-changing album", but "it should churn out enough hits to secure her place on the pop culture radar until her next offering." Spin magazine editor Brittany Spanos noted the album's lacked "cohesion", but stated "Therein lies the strength of Kiss Me Once: Minogue's ability to turn any contrived situation into something positive, magical, and utterly her own."

Marc Hirsh from Boston Globe criticized the track "Sexercize", but ultimately said about the album; "It's the album's only genuine misstep, but it's still perplexing, hearing a Minogue that can do wrong." Joe Muggs from Fact magazine awarded it 3.5 points out of 5. Muggs felt majority of the album contained too many fillers and exemplified the songs "Les Sex", "I Was Gonna Cancel", and "Sexercize", but commended the overall production, Minogue's vocal deliveries in most tracks, and the quality. Similarly, Entertainment Weekly writer Adam Markovitz graded it B− and criticized the "sex" tracks. However, he complimented Minogue's "plucky" charm and felt it was more a treat to her fanbase. Kitty Empire from The Observer said "Polished but kittenish, Kiss Me Once remains true to the effervescent dance-pop for which Kylie is known. But the scenery around this album has altered profoundly." Neil McCormick from The Telegraph awarded it three stars, and complimented her "charm", the album's hooks, and the overall electronic sound, but criticized her lack of innovation through the production and songwriting field. The Guardians Alexis Petridis also awarded the album three stars and listed it as his album of the week of 13 March 2014. He commented that the overall release was "glossy and depthless", and concluded "Her voice isn't the strongest, the lyrics are woeful and filler abounds – but Kylie hasn't lost her knack for producing a superior brand of pop...".

However, the album attracted criticism for the production and certain material, alongside Minogue's lack of innovation. Chris Bosnan from Consequence of Sound graded it C+, and exclaimed that the overall package represented "chameleonic" qualities and ended "This eclecticism yields a booming, fun pop record that is refreshing by not attempting to be anything other, though that same inessentialism keeps the record from reaching transcendence." However, he criticized the second half for its "boisterous" production and felt it "lost momentum", apart from the track "Fine". Annie Zalenski from The A.V. Club was less enthusiastic, who gave it C−. She felt the material "drain[ed]" Minogue's original pop sound, and said "Kiss Me Once is a disappointing record that tries too hard to mold Minogue into something she's not." Lydia Jenkins from New Zealand Herald awarded the record three stars, and felt majority of the content was unoriginal but highlighted "Into the Blue" as "half-decent", "Million Miles" and "Fine" as "club fillers", and "Sexy Love" as a rip-off from the song "California Gurls" by American singer Katy Perry. Kevin Ritchie from Now Toronto gave it two marks out of five, and labelled it "bad". He criticized the second half of the album, and felt majority of the songs like "Sexercize" were "dated" yet "overproduced" and the sound was "murky". Philip Matusavage from MusicOMH gave it two stars, and wrote scathingly "It's crushingly disappointing, then, to find that Kiss Me Once is perhaps her most anonymous offering to date." Matusavage also criticized the material, feeling it would have been "rejections" from an album by Barbados recording artist Rihanna.

Based on the average shares and reactions on Metacritic, Kiss Me Once was ranked as the 47th most discussed album of 2014. Similarly, it appeared at number 6 on American website Idolator's Best Album of 2014 reader's poll. According to the editor Eduardo Lima, he said "Kylie. Kiss Me Once. The best pop album. I just can´t get enough of it."

Commercial performance

Kiss Me Once debuted atop of the Australian Albums Chart with 8,166 copies sold. It was Minogue's first number-one album since X (2007) and her fourth overall, tying with country musician Kasey Chambers for the most number-one albums achieved by a female Australian artist. The album slipped to number six the following week with 2,261 units sold, bringing the two week total to 10,247 copies. After falling for five weeks, the album rose to number 27 in its sixth and final charting week, Minogue's shortest run for a studio album since Let's Get to It (1991). The album sold approximately 15,000 copies in Australia by May 2014. In New Zealand, the album spent a sole week at number 13, marking Minogue's sixth top 20 entry on the New Zealand Albums Chart.

In the UK, the album faced competition against George Michael's live album Symphonica for the top position. On the chart published on 23 March, Kiss Me Once opened at number two on the UK Albums Chart with 29,251 copies sold, marking Minogue's eleventh top five entry. The album slipped to number eight the following week, before falling out of the top 10 in the third week.  Kiss Me Once spent a total of 12 weeks inside the top 100 chart, and placed at number 93 on the UK album year-end chart in 2014. It was certified silver by the British Phonographic Industry (BPI) on 23 May 2014 for sales exceeding 60,000 units. The album had shifted 90,884 units in the UK by October 2020. Kiss Me Once also peaked on two other regional music charts compiled by the Official Charts Company, the Scottish Albums Chart and the Irish Albums Chart, at number three and number four, respectively.

In the United States, the album opened modestly at number 31 on the Billboard 200 with first-week sales of 12,000 copies. That week, Kiss Me Once also debuted at number three on the US Dance/Electronic Albums and at number 26 on the Tastemaker Albums chart. The album peaked at number 15 on the Canadian Albums Chart, Minogue's third album to chart in the territory. In Japan, the album debuted at number 40 on the Oricon Albums Chart, selling 3,088 units in its first week and marking her eighth top 40 entry. The album stayed on the chart for a total of 8 weeks. In South Korea, the album peaked at number 96 on the Gaon Album Chart, and on the International Albums Chart at number 24. Kiss Me Once debuted at the top of the Hungarian Albums Chart and stayed there for three weeks. It later became the 36th best-selling album in Hungary of 2016. In France, the album peaked at number 10 on the albums chart, Minogue's last top-ten entry in the 2010s, and sold 15,000 copies as of July 2014. The album also peaked within the top 10 in the Czech Republic, Croatia, Switzerland, Germany, Slovenia, the Netherlands, and Spain. In Belgium, the album appeared on both regional charts: it peaked at number 10 on the Ultratop Flanders chart, and number 13 on the Wallonia chart. In Italy, Denmark, Austria, and Finland, the album peaked inside the top 20. By early June 2014, Kiss Me Once had sold roughly 200,000 units worldwide.

Aftermath
After the album's release, several publications deemed the commercial value of the album as a flop. In retrospect, Minogue commented; "Maybe it didn't do as well because it wasn't good enough or it didn't deserve more, who knows?". She further exclaimed, "Even in retrospect it's hard to say why something works or it doesn't. It's dependent on what else is out there, the way it's promoted... The tour has been the most successful part of that album campaign for me. The album did give me some freedom." In June 2015, publications reported Minogue's departure from Parlophone due to the performance of Kiss Me Once, which she first denied. However, she later confirmed she had parted with the label in December 2015 and would stay permanently with Warner Music Australia; she announced her album Kylie Christmas that same month, which would be her final overall release with Parlophone.

Track listingNotes'  signifies a vocal producer
  signifies a co-producer
  signifies a vocal co-producer
  signifies a remixer
 "Feels So Good" is a cover of "Indiana" written and recorded by Tom Aspaul.
 On censored versions of the album, "Sexy Love" is titled "Love", "Sexercize" is titled "Exercize" and "Les Sex" is retitled "We Could Call It".

Personnel
Credits adapted from the liner notes of the special edition of Kiss Me Once''.

Recording locations

 Westlake, Santa Monica, California 
 Cutfather, Copenhagen 
 Metropolis, London 
 Glenwood, Burbank, California 
 Pulse, Los Angeles 
 Serenity West Recording, Los Angeles 
 Conway, Los Angeles 
 Heavy Duty, Los Angeles 
 Rinse, London 
 Metrophonic, London 
 South Point, Miami 
 Subcoustic, London 
 The Chocolate Factory, London 
 Echo, Los Angeles

Musicians

 Kylie Minogue – lead vocals
 Mike Del Rio – programming 
 Kelly "Madame Buttons" Sheehan – backing vocals 
 Marco Lisboa – additional programming 
 Daniel Davidsen – guitars ; bass 
 Chelcee Grimes – backing vocals 
 Mich Hansen – percussion 
 Peter Wallevik – all other instruments 
 Wayne Hector – backing vocals 
 Autumn Rowe – backing vocals 
 Eliel Lazo – percussion 
 Johny Sårde – percussion 
 Oliver McEwan – additional bass 
 Tom Aspaul – backing vocals 
 MNEK – drums 
 Tommy King – additional keys 
 Jamie Muhoberac – additional keys 
 Jesse Shatkin – bass, guitars, keyboards, piano, programming 
 Erick Serna – guitars 
 Enrique Iglesias – vocals 
 Andy Wallace – piano 
 Alex Smith – keyboards, programming 
 Mark Taylor – keyboards, programming 
 Sam Preston – guitar 
 Karen Poole – backing vocals 
 Greg Kurstin – bass, keyboards, piano, programming

Technical

 Mike Del Rio – production 
 Kelly "Madame Buttons" Sheehan – vocal production 
 Peter Wallevik – production 
 Daniel Davidsen – production 
 Cutfather – production 
 Joe Kearns – vocal engineering ; vocal co-production, additional engineering 
 Pharrell Williams – production 
 The Monsters & the Strangerz – production 
 Wayne Wilkins – vocal production 
 MNEK – vocal production 
 Ariel Rechtshaid – production 
 J.D. Walker – production 
 GoodWill & MGI – production 
 Jesse Shatkin – production 
 Rob Kleiner – engineering 
 Mark Taylor – production 
 Alex Smith – co-production 
 Ren Swan – mixing, recording 
 Carlos Paucar – vocal recording 
 Chris Loco – production, recording 
 Thomas Olsen – production 
 Greg Kurstin – production, vocal production 
 Alex Pasco – additional engineering 
 Aaron Ahmad – additional engineering assistance 
 Kylie Minogue – executive production
 Sia – executive production
 Phil Tan – mixing 
 Daniela Rivera – mixing assistance 
 Geoff Pesche – mastering 
 Tom Coyne – mastering 
 Aya Merrill – mastering

Artwork
 Adjective Noun – design
 William Baker – photography

Charts

Weekly charts

Year-end charts

Certification and sales

Release history

See also
 List of number-one albums of 2014 (Australia)
 List of UK top-ten albums in 2014

References

Footnotes

Media notes

Print sources

External links
 
 Kiss Me Once at Kylie.com (archived from 2014)

2014 albums
Albums produced by Ariel Rechtshaid
Albums produced by Cutfather
Albums produced by Greg Kurstin
Albums produced by Pharrell Williams
Albums produced by Mark Taylor (music producer)
Albums produced by MNEK
Albums recorded at Westlake Recording Studios
Kylie Minogue albums
Parlophone albums
Warner Records albums